Hassan Al Salis (born 5 July 2000) is a Saudi Arabian professional footballer who plays as a forward for Saudi Professional League side Al-Fateh.

Career
Al Salis started his career at the youth team of Al-Taraji and represented the club at every level. He was promoted to the first team during the 2018–19 season. On 30 June 2019, Al Salis was chosen in the scholarship program to develop football talents established by General Sports Authority in Saudi Arabia. On 21 July 2020, Al Salis joined Al-Ettifaq on a five-year deal. On 31 July 2022, Al Salis joined Al-Fateh on a four-year deal.

References

External links
 

2000 births
Living people
Saudi Arabian footballers
Saudi Arabia youth international footballers
Association football forwards
Al-Taraji Club players
Ettifaq FC players
Al-Fateh SC players
Saudi Fourth Division players
Saudi Professional League players
Saudi Arabian Shia Muslims